Lieutenant General Dai Li (Tai Li; ; May 28, 1897 – March 17, 1946) was a Chinese spymaster. His courtesy name was Yunong (雨農). Born Dai Chunfeng (Tai Chun-feng; 戴春風) in Bao'an, Jiangshan, Zhejiang province, he studied at the Whampoa Military Academy, where Chiang Kai-shek served as Chief Commandant, and later became head of Chiang's military intelligence agency: the Bureau of Investigation and Statistics or ("jūntǒng" (军统) in short) of Republican China (1912-1949).

Early years
Born Dai Chunfeng, he was just four years old when his father died, leaving his mother to raise him. At the age of six, Dai was enrolled in a private academy to study Chinese classics; he later graduated as valedictorian from Wenxi County Elementary School.  His mother could not afford to send him to university, so at the age of 16 he had to leave home and make his own way in the world. With no steady income or guidance, he began living on the streets of Shanghai. Until 1923, he was mentored by labor organizer and hitman Wang Yaqiao. Dai Chunfeng soon became a skilled gambler who could often be found in one of Shanghai's many casinos, trying to win enough money to make ends meet. It was in a Shanghai casino that he met Du Yuesheng, head of the criminal organization known as the "Green Gang".

Through Du Yuesheng, he later met Chiang Kai-shek. It is unclear when Chiang and Dai first met, but it was probably around 1921. Dai later lost all his money and was forced to return to Bao'an. In 1927, Dai met his elementary school friend Mao Renfeng, who suggested that Dai enroll in the Whampoa Military Academy in Guangzhou, where Chiang served as Superintendent-Commandant (1924-1927). Dai followed the suggestion, obtained a letter of recommendation from Du Yuesheng, and made his way to Guangzhou. In 1925, Dai enrolled in the 1st Student Regiment of the Sixth Class of the KMT Officer Training Academy.
At this time, he changed his name to "Dai Li," which in Chinese refers to an assassin's hooded veil, reflecting the clandestine nature of his planned future career. Chiang soon made him a student informant to spy on Communist activities within the academy, where he played an instrumental role in the Zhongshan Warship Incident of March 1926.

Role in KMT
As chief of Kuomintang (KMT) Army Intelligence in China, Dai Li helped establish China's first modern intelligence organization in 1928: the "Clandestine Investigation Section" directly under the headquarters of the Northern Expeditionary Army, with the goal of winning the war early, quelling nationwide unrest, and minimizing loss of life by making the best use of military and political intelligence. By the end of the Second Sino-Japanese War, this small section would evolve into the very complex and controversial Investigation and Statistics Bureau of the Chinese National Military Council, which was the predecessor of the Military Intelligence Bureau of the Ministry of National Defense of Taiwan.

The benign title of the Investigation and Statistics Bureau belied the true nature of its secret police work, which made Dai one of the most powerful men in Republican China. Dai was also the head of the Blue Shirts Society, an ultra-nationalist organization that provided security and intelligence for Chiang. In the 1930s and 1940s, his agents in the Military Statistics Bureau (then the KMT's military intelligence agency) successfully penetrated the Chinese Communist Party (CCP) and Imperial Japanese puppet organizations.

Dai cooperated with the United States during World War II, learning new methods of espionage and growing his guerrilla force to some 70,000 men. In return for the partnership, he provided maps of the southern Chinese coast, intelligence on Japanese maneuvers, and safe haven for downed Allied aircrew. After the signing of the Sino-American Cooperative Organization Treaty in 1942, Dai was appointed head of Sino-American intelligence activities.

While he shunned public entertainment and remained a mysterious figure to his countrymen, Dai was privately known for his wild drinking parties.

Death
Dai died in a plane crash on March 17, 1946. It was speculated that this may have been arranged by the Chinese Communist Party's intelligence and security chief, Kang Sheng, of the Central Social Affairs Department (SAD). Rumors circulated that the crash had been arranged by the American Office of Strategic Services (OSS) because of Dai's anti-Americanism, since it occurred on an American plane.

In popular culture
 In the Nickelodeon animated TV series Avatar: The Last Airbender, the intelligence service and secret police of the Earth Kingdom capital city, Ba Sing Se, is named “Dai Li” in reference to him.

References

 Wakeman, Frederic E. Spymaster: Dai Li and the Chinese Secret Service. Berkeley: University of California Press, 2003.
Military Intelligence B..-History

1897 births
1946 deaths
Politicians from Quzhou
Republic of China politicians from Zhejiang
Spymasters
Members of the Kuomintang
Victims of aviation accidents or incidents in China
People from Jiangshan
Chinese nationalists
Chinese fascists
Politicide perpetrators
Directors of intelligence agencies